Carmelo Merlo (born 16 July 1881, date of death unknown) was an Argentine fencer. He competed in three Olympic Games in the sabre competitions.

References

External links
 

1881 births
Year of death missing
Argentine male fencers
Argentine sabre fencers
Olympic fencers of Argentina
Fencers at the 1924 Summer Olympics
Fencers at the 1932 Summer Olympics
Fencers at the 1936 Summer Olympics
Fencers from Buenos Aires
20th-century Argentine people